Thiollierea is a genus of shrubs in the family Rubiaceae.  The genus is  endemic to New Caledonia in the Pacific and contains 16 species which used to be placed in the genera Bikkia or Morierina

List of species 
 Thiollierea artensis 
 Thiollierea campanulata 
 Thiollierea dagostinii 
 Thiollierea kaalaensis 
 Thiollierea laureana 
 Thiollierea lenormandii 
 Thiollierea macrophylla 
 Thiollierea montana
 Thiollierea naounarum
 Thiollierea pachyphylla 
 Thiollierea papineaui
 Thiollierea parviflora 
 Thiollierea propinqua
 Thiollierea retusiflora 
 Thiollierea rigaultii 
 Thiollierea tubiflora

References

 
Endemic flora of New Caledonia
Rubiaceae genera